The 2019 Italian GT Championship was the 28th season of the Italian GT Championship, a grand tourer-style sports car racing competition founded by the Italian Automobile Club (ACI). The championship consisted of four sprint race events and four endurance race events. Each sprint race event consisted of two races. The season started on 5 April in Monza and ended on 18 October at the same circuit.

Teams and Drivers

GT3

GT Light

GT Cup

GT4

References

Italian Motorsports Championships
Italian GT Championship